Hedley is the debut studio album recorded by Canadian rock band Hedley, released in Canada on September 6, 2005, through Universal Music Canada. The album reached the top 3 on the Canadian Albums Chart and has been certified double platinum by Music Canada. It garnered a nomination for Rock Album of the Year at the 2006 Juno Awards.

Six tracks were released as singles: "On My Own", "Villain", "Trip", "321", "Gunnin'", and "Street Fight". The music videos for all of these songs, except "Villain" and "Street Fight", reached #1 on the MuchMusic countdown.

Following Hedley signing a US record deal with Capitol Records in the summer of 2006, the album was released in the US on September 26, 2006. In Canada, a "Platinum edition" of the album was released on November 21, 2006, with four bonus tracks and the updated album cover.

Seven of the songs are featured on the 2009 US version of their next album Famous Last Words, released under the title Never Too Late.

Singles
"On My Own" is the first single released from the album on July 18, 2005. The music video premiered on MuchMusic on August 2. The song peaked at number one on the Canadian Singles Chart and earned a nomination for "Best Rock Video" at the MuchMusic Video Awards in 2006. 

"Villain" was released on July 26, 2005 as the second single. The song peaked at number 18 on the Canada Rock chart.

"Trip" was released on October 4, 2005 as the third single. The song peaked at number 11 on the Canadian Singles Chart and won a Juno Award in 2007 for "Producer of the Year". 

"321" is the fourth single released on March 14, 2006. The song peaked at number 21 on the Canada CHR/Top 30.

"Gunnin'" was released on September 12, 2006 as the fifth single. The song won two MuchMusic Video Awards in 2007 for "Best Pop Video of the Year" and "Best Post-Production of the Year".

"Street Fight" was released on December 2006 as the sixth and final single from the album.

Critical reception

Corey Apar of AllMusic rated the album two stars out of five and described it as "competent though largely uninteresting." In particular, he criticized the lyrics and the lack of engagement ("Even the... standout tracks... aren't that memorable," writes Apar, "taking a couple spins to really grab listeners at all.") Starpulse gave the album one-and-a-half stars out of five.

Despite the album receiving negative reviews, it was nominated at the 2006 Juno Awards for "Rock Album of the Year". In 2007, it was nominated for "Album of the Year" at the Juno Awards. 

The album went platinum in Canada in December 2005 selling over 100,000 units. In 2008, the album was certified 2× platinum.

Track listing

Personnel
Credits for Hedley adapted from AllMusic.

Hedley
 Jacob Hoggard – lead vocals
 Dave Rosin – guitar, backing vocals
 Tommy Mac – bass guitar, backing vocals 
 Chris Crippin – drums, backing vocals

Additional musicians
 Dave Genn – guitar
 Brian Howes – guitar, keyboards, backing vocals
 Ben Kaplan - guitar

Production
 Garnet Armstrong – art direction, design
 Zach Blackstone – assistant 
 Mike Cashin – assistant 
 Paul Forgues – guitar engineer
 Mike Fraser – mixing
 GGGarth – producer
 Darren Gilmore – management
 Brian Howes - producer
 Ben Kaplan - digital editing, programming
 Dean Maher - engineer
 George Marino - mastering
 Adam McGhie - assistant engineer
 James Morin - assistant
 Ivan Otis - photography
 Shawn Penner - assistant
 Misha Rajaratnam - digital editing
 Randy Staub - mixing
 Rob Stephanson - assistant engineer
 Jim Vallance - composer

Charts and certifications

Weekly charts

Certifications

Release history

References

2005 debut albums
Albums produced by Garth Richardson
Albums recorded at Armoury Studios
Albums recorded at Greenhouse Studios
Albums recorded at Hipposonic Studios
Hedley (band) albums
Universal Music Canada albums